The Aalborg Airport railway line is a branch line railway designed to link Aalborg, Denmark with its airport, as part of an initiative to improve transport between the city and the airport. 
It opened on 13 December 2020 at a cost of 276 million DKK.

Background
The feasibility studies started in 2017 and were followed by detailed design and expropriation in 2018. The actual construction was in 2019 and 2020.  Construction officially started in February 2019.

The line starts as a branch line north of Lindholm Station. A new station was built at the airport, with a bridge built over Lindholm Å.

References

External links

 Banedanmark – government agency responsible for maintenance and traffic control of most of the Danish railway network
 DSB – largest Danish train operating company
 Danske Jernbaner – website with information on railway history in Denmark
 Nordjyllands Jernbaner – website with information on railway history in North Jutland
 Aalborg Airport

Airport rail links
Railway lines in Denmark
Rail transport in the North Jutland Region
Railway lines opened in 2020